Fencing events at the 2018 Summer Youth Olympics were held from 7 to 10 October at the Africa Pavilion in Buenos Aires, Argentina.

Qualification
Each National Olympic Committee (NOC) can enter a maximum of 6 competitors, 3 per each gender and 1 per each weapon. 66 places was decided at the 2018 Cadet World Championships held in Verona, Italy from 1–9 April 2018. Ten athletes per each individual event (1 from Africa, 2 from the Americas, 3 from Asia/Oceania and 4 from Europe) qualified. Furthermore, the top six ranked individual athletes that have not qualified overall across all genders will also qualify, with a maximum one per event per NOC (2 from Oceania and 1 from the other four continents). As hosts, Argentina is able to enter athletes in all six events and a further three wildcards were awarded per gender. These were awarded to: Costa Rica, Lebanon, Togo, Saudi Arabia, Iraq and Senegal.

To be eligible to participate at the Youth Olympics athletes must have been born between 1 January 2001 and 31 December 2003.

Medal summary

Medal table

Events

References

External links
Official Results Book – Fencing

 
2018 Summer Youth Olympics events
Youth Summer Olympics
International fencing competitions hosted by Argentina
2018